Linaceae is a family of flowering plants. The family is cosmopolitan, and includes about 250 species in 14 genera, classified into two subfamilies: the Linoideae and Hugonioideae (often recognized as a distinct family, the Hugoniaceae). Leaves of the Linaceae are always simple; arrangement varies from alternate (most species) to opposite (in Sclerolinon and some Linum) or whorled (in some Hesperolinon and Linum species). The hermaphroditic, actinomorphic flowers are pentameric or, very rarely, tetrameric (e.g., Radiola linoides, Linum keniense).

In the Linoideae, the largest genus is Linum, the flaxes, with 180–200 species including the cultivated flax, Linum usitatissimum. Members of the Linoideae include herbaceous annuals and perennials, as well as woody subshrubs, shrubs, and small trees (Tirpitzia) inhabiting temperate and tropical latitudes of Eurasia, Africa, Australia, and the Americas. The largest genus of the Hugonioideae is Hugonia (about 40 species); the Hugonioideae are woody vines, shrubs, and trees, and are almost entirely tropical in distribution. In addition to their growth habits and geographic distributions, the Linoideae and Hugonioideae can be differentiated by the number of fertile stamens (five in the Linoideae, 10 in the Hugonioideae) and fruit type (capsules in the Linoideae, fleshy drupe-like fruits in the Hugonioideae).

Genera in subfamily Linoideae
Anisadenia Wall. ex Meisn. (2 sp.)
Hesperolinon (Gray) Small (13 sp.)
Linum L. (approximately 200 species)
Radiola Hill (1 sp.)
Reinwardtia Dumort. (1 sp.)
Sclerolinon C.M.Rogers (1 sp.)
Tirpitzia Hallier f. (3 sp.)

Former genera; Cliococca (synonym of Linum L.)

Genera in subfamily Hugonioideae
Hebepetalum Benth. (3 sp.)
Hugonia l. (6 sp.)
Indorouchera Hallier f. (1 sp.)
Roucheria Planch. (7 sp.)

Former genera; Durandea (synonym of Hugonia L.,) and Philbornea (synonym of Hugonia L.)

Under the old Cronquist system of classifying the flowering plants, the Linaceae were placed in their own order, the Linales. Modern classifications place them in the order Malpighiales.

References

External links
 
 Linaceae in Topwalks
 Angiosperm Phylogeny Website entry for Linaceae
 Linaceae in BoDD – Botanical Dermatology Database

 
Malpighiales families